Almir Lopes de Luna (born 20 May 1982, in João Pessoa), or simply Almir, is a Brazilian footballer who plays as an attacking midfielder for Treze.

External links 
 
 
 

1982 births
Living people
Association football forwards
Brazilian footballers
Brazilian expatriate footballers
Campeonato Brasileiro Série A players
Campeonato Brasileiro Série B players
Campeonato Brasileiro Série D players
K League 1 players
Expatriate footballers in South Korea
Expatriate footballers in Kuwait
People from João Pessoa, Paraíba
Brazilian expatriate sportspeople in South Korea
Botafogo de Futebol e Regatas players
Associação Atlética Ponte Preta players
Ulsan Hyundai FC players
Pohang Steelers players
Incheon United FC players
Associação Desportiva Cabofriense players
Clube Atlético Mineiro players
Bangu Atlético Clube players
Figueirense FC players
América Futebol Clube (RN) players
Vila Nova Futebol Clube players
CR Flamengo footballers
Brasiliense Futebol Clube players
Treze Futebol Clube players
Al Salmiya SC players
Kuwait Premier League players
Brazilian expatriate sportspeople in Kuwait
Sportspeople from Paraíba